Södermalm is a city district area (often referred to as a borough) in central Stockholm, Sweden. Södermalm borough has a population of around 110,000, making it the most populated borough of Stockholm.
The urban development project of Hammarby Sjöstad is located in the Södermalm borough.

Overview
Södermalm was created 1 January 2007, through the merging of the boroughs of Maria-Gamla Stan and Katarina-Sofia. It covers the island of Södermalm and some neighboring districts. The two former boroughs made up the eastern and western half of the island of Södermalm. Maria-Gamla Stan was the result of a previous merging between the original borough with the same name, and the former borough of Hornstull, in 1999.  Maria-Gamla Stan also included the island districts of Gamla Stan, Långholmen, Reimersholme, Riddarholmen and Årsta holmar; Katarina-Sofia included the district Södra Hammarbyhamnen south of Södermalm. All these districts are now parts of the new Södermalm borough.

Gallery

References

External links

Boroughs of Stockholm